The Battle of Chingleput was a short siege in early 1752, during the Second Carnatic War. About 700 East India Company recruits and sepoys under the command of Robert Clive captured the fortress of Chingleput, near Madras, defended by a French East India Company garrison of about 40 Europeans and 500 troops.

References

George Bruce. Harbottle's Dictionary of Battles. (Van Nostrand Reinhold, 1981).

Battles involving Great Britain
Battles involving France
Battles of the Second Carnatic War
Battles involving the Indian kingdoms
Conflicts in 1752
1752 in India
Sieges involving the British East India Company
Battles involving the British East India Company
Battles involving the French East India Company
French East India Company
History of Tamil Nadu